James Z. Bogart (March 26, 1821 – March 28, 1881) was an American 
law enforcement officer and police captain with the New York City Police Department. 
A member of the old Municipal police force, he joined the Metropolitan Police Department upon its formation in 1857. From his official appointment on April 23, 1857, Bogart rose from roundsman, to sergeant and finally captain within only a few years. He served in a number of important posts throughout the city, including the Twelfth, Twenty-Second and Thirty-First Precincts.

During the New York Draft Riots in 1863, Bogart led a police force made up of reserve members from the Thirty-First Precinct and the Broadway Squad against rioters looting the home of J.S. Gibbons, a cousin of New York Tribune editor Horace Greeley, at Lamartine Place near Eighth Avenue and Twenty-Ninth Street. After a half hour of fierce fighting, particularly among the female rioters, the battle was broken up by a detachment of soldiers who fired a volley into the crowd striking police and rioters alike. One patrolman was killed and two were seriously wounded by the attack.

He was also the precinct captain of Twenty-Second station at the time of his retirement on June 6, 1870. He was given a $1,000 a year pension and placed on the retired list where he would remain for over ten years. He ran a fish stand on Third Avenue until his death at East One Hundred and Twelfth Street on the night of March 28, 1881, only two days after his 60th birthday.

References

Further reading
Bernstein, Iver. The New York City Draft Riots: Their Significance for American Society and Politics in the Age of the Civil War. New York: Oxford University Press, 1991.
Cook, Adrian. The Armies of the Streets: The New York City Draft Riots of 1863. Lexington: University Press of Kentucky, 1974.
Costello, Augustine E. Our Police Protectors: History of the New York Police from the Earliest Period to the Present Time. New York: A.E. Costello, 1885. 
McCague, James. The Second Rebellion: The Story of the New York City Draft Riots of 1863. New York: Dial Press, 1968.

1821 births
1881 deaths
New York City Police Department officers
People from Harlem